Blue Skies is an album by the saxophonist Stan Getz, recorded in San Francisco in 1982 but not released on the Concord Jazz label until 1995.

Reception

The AllMusic review by Alex Henderson stated: "True to form, Getz makes the listener marvel at his tone throughout the album; without question, he had one of the sexiest, most gorgeous tones in the history of jazz. It's unfortunate that this excellent material went unreleased for 13 years".

Track listing
 "Spring Is Here" (Richard Rodgers, Lorenz Hart) - 7:08
 "Antigny" (Marc Johnson) - 7:34
 "Easy Living" (Ralph Rainger, Leo Robin) - 7:42
 "There We Go" (Jim McNeely) - 8:24
 "Blue Skies" (Irving Berlin) - 6:39
 "How Long Has This Been Going On?" (George Gershwin, Ira Gershwin) - 5:54

Personnel 
Stan Getz - tenor saxophone
Jim McNeely - piano
Marc Johnson - bass
Billy Hart - drums

References 

1995 albums
Stan Getz albums
Concord Records albums
Albums produced by Carl Jefferson